Okeechobee is a city in and the county seat of Okeechobee County, Florida, United States. As of the 2020 United States Census, the city's population was 5,254. 

The Lake Okeechobee area was severely damaged in the 1928 Okeechobee Hurricane, the first recorded Category 5 hurricane in the North Atlantic. This was one of the deadliest hurricanes ever to strike the US.

Okeechobee is served by the Okeechobee County Airport.

History

Okeechobee is close to the site of the Battle of Lake Okeechobee, a major battle of the Second Seminole War, fought between forces under the command of Zachary Taylor and Seminole warriors resisting forced removal to Indian Territory west of the Mississippi River in the 1830s. (This territory was later admitted as the state of Oklahoma in 1907.)

In the 1930s, Okeechobee was the commercial center for the surrounding area, shipping hundreds of train cars of winter vegetables annually. It had poultry farms, a catfish shipping plant, and a bullfrog breeding industry. 

The Florida guide described bullfrog breeding in the Okeechobee region:

Demographics

As of the 2020 census, the city of Okeechobee had a population of 5,254 and 1,814 households. 

Of the city's population, 7.2% were under 5 years old, 24.1% were under 18 years old, and 15.1% were 65 years and over. 46.5% of the population was female.

85.1% of the population was white, 8.6% was black or African American, 0.2% was American Indian or Alaska Native, 3.1% was Asian, 2.8% was two or more races, and 33.0% was Hispanic or Latino. 

There were 367 veterans living in the city and 12.2% were Foreign born persons. 

The median household income (in 2020 dollars) was $40,425 with a per capita income of $19,633. 18.4% of the population lived below the poverty threshold.

Geography

Okeechobee is located just north of Lake Okeechobee. Taylor Creek flows through the east side of the town. The area is served by US routes 98 and 441 and state routes 70, 700 and 15.

Climate 

Okeechobee has a humid subtropical climate (Cfa), bordering within one degree of a tropical climate with hot, humid summers and warm, drier winters.

Points of interest

On 25 December 1837, Lake Okeechobee became the site of an important battle in the Second Seminole War, fought between a number of Seminole Native American groups, the United States government, and allied militias. The battlefield is now the site of a  park, and annual reenactments.

In 2016, the Okeechobee Music & Arts Festival was organized for the first time. This multi-day, multi-genre music festival attracted approximately 30,000 people to the city in its first year. The annual festival has continued since then, and is planned for 2023.

Notable people

Janet Bonnema, civil engineer
Kutter Crawford, baseball player
Lonnie Pryor, football player
Reggie Rembert, football player
Thomas Rooney, U.S. House of Representatives, Florida's 17th congressional district
Evan Neal, football player

References

External links
 City of Okeechobee

County seats in Florida
Cities in Okeechobee County, Florida
Cities in Florida
Populated places on Lake Okeechobee
1917 establishments in Florida
Populated places established in 1917